Samuel Hawkins was an American Negro league outfielder in the 1910s.

Hawkins played for the Philadelphia Giants in 1913 and 1914, and also played for the Cuban Giants in 1914. In seven recorded career games, he posted eight hits in 29 plate appearances.

References

External links
Baseball statistics and player information from Baseball-Reference Black Baseball Stats and Seamheads

Year of birth missing
Year of death missing
Place of birth missing
Place of death missing
Cuban Giants players
Philadelphia Giants players
Baseball outfielders